The 2001–02 season was Burnley's 2nd season in the second tier of English football. They were managed by Stan Ternent in his fourth full season since he replaced Chris Waddle at the beginning 1998–99 campaign.

Appearances and goals
	
	
	
	
	

	
	

		
	
	
		

	

|}

Transfers

In

Out

Matches

First Division

Final league position

League Cup

1st Round

FA Cup

3rd Round

4th Round

References

Burnley F.C. seasons
Burnley